PKP Class OKz32 is a Polish tank locomotive of Polskie Koleje Państwowe, designed for hauling passenger trains in mountain regions, built in 1934-1935. The designation stood for passenger (O) tank (K) 2-10-2 (z) steam locomotive accepted in 1932.

History 
The locomotive was designed in Poland specially for passenger traffic on mountain route Kraków – Zakopane in Tatra Mountains. It was constructed in H. Cegielski works in Poznań, under direction of Prof. Antoni Xsiężopolski. The first locomotive was made in 1934 and appeared successful. A series of 25 in total was built in 1934-1935 for Polskie Koleje Państwowe. The locomotive could haul heavier trains (350 tonnes), than German-origin TKt1 and TKt2 (250 tonnes), and was faster. They were also used with freight trains.

During World War II 18 locomotives were captured by the Germans and impressed into service as DRG class 953, with numbers 301 to 318 (two of them were first captured by the Soviets, then by the Germans in 1941). Remaining 7 locomotives were seized by the Soviets in Poland and converted to broad gauge by 1941. They served in Ural Mountains during the war. Along with further locomotives captured from the Germans, Soviet Union operated 11 locomotives after the war, until 1966.

After World War II, Poland reclaimed 11 locomotives, receiving new numbers OKz32-1 to 11. They served still until 1970s. One – OKz32-2 (former OKz32-5) was preserved, in Chabówka Railway Museum. It was operable as of 2016.

References

 

Railway locomotives introduced in 1934
OKz32
2-10-2T locomotives
Standard gauge locomotives of Poland